"Primrose Lane" is a song made famous by country music singer Jerry Wallace. Originally released in 1959, the song rose to number 8 on the Billboard Hot 100.  The song was ranked #47 on Billboard magazine's Top Hot 100 songs of 1959.

Background
In the song, the singer appears to be serenading his love as they stroll down the street and claiming "life's a holiday" with her.

Chart performance

Cover versions
"Supper-club Soul" singer O.C. Smith remade the song in 1970, scoring a modest hit. The record reached #86 pop, #4 Easy Listening on the Billboard charts.

Popular culture
In 1971, "Primrose Lane" became the theme song of the ABC sitcom The Smith Family, sung by producer Don Fedderson's son, Mike Minor.

References

1959 singles
Jerry Wallace songs
Songs written by Wayne Shanklin
1959 songs

hu:Primrose Lane